Thomas McQueen (21 February 1929 – 10 February 2015) was a Scottish footballer who played as a goalkeeper in both the Scottish and English Football Leagues. He is the father of former Leeds United and Scotland defender Gordon McQueen.

Career
As a youth, McQueen was signed for Motherwell by former Scotland international George Stevenson. He made no first team appearances at the club and after short spells at Leith Athletic and Alloa Athletic, joined his local Junior side, Kilbirnie Ladeside. His four years at the club culminated in a victorious Scottish Junior Cup final appearance in 1952, with Ladeside defeating Camelon Juniors 1–0 in front of 69,959 supporters at Hampden Park. The Camelon side contained John Hansen, father of future Scotland internationalists Alan and John.

McQueen's success earned him a move to reigning Scottish League champions Hibernian, but he was unable to dislodge incumbent goalkeeper Tommy Younger and made only three league appearances for the Edinburgh side. He moved on to Queen of the South in 1953 before joining the large Scots colony at Accrington Stanley under manager Walter Galbraith. McQueen made eighty appearances for Accrington and his renowned long kicking became a tactic in the club's most successful era. Returning to Scotland, McQueen played out his career with East Fife, Berwick Rangers and Stranraer.

After retiring, McQueen returned to his trade as a joiner while in his spare time, he was a successful breeder of Border canaries as well as being a member of The Salvation Army.

McQueen died 11 days before his 86th birthday at the University Hospital Crosshouse, Kilmarnock, East Ayrshire. He was survived by his three children, including former Scotland international and Leeds United defender Gordon, and Iain who is assistant secretary and treasurer of the Scottish Junior Football Association. He was also the grandfather of Sky Sports presenter Hayley McQueen.

Honours 
 Kilburnie Laeside
 Scottish Junior Cup: 1951–52
 Western League: 1951–52

References

1929 births
2015 deaths
Association football goalkeepers
Hibernian F.C. players
Footballers from West Lothian
Motherwell F.C. players
Leith Athletic F.C. players
Alloa Athletic F.C. players
Kilbirnie Ladeside F.C. players
Queen of the South F.C. players
Accrington Stanley F.C. (1891) players
East Fife F.C. players
Berwick Rangers F.C. players
Stranraer F.C. players
Scottish Football League players
English Football League players
Scottish Junior Football Association players
Scottish footballers